Castrovido is a town in the province of Burgos, Castilla y Leon, Spain.

Towns in Spain
Province of Burgos